Guévin Tormin (born 28 October 1997) is a French professional footballer who plays as a midfielder.

Career
On 30 July 2021, Tormin signed with Turkish TFF First League club Manisa after having played two seasons for Châteauroux in Ligue 2.

Personal life
Tormin is the brother of the footballer Tyrone Tormin.

References

External links
 
 
 

1997 births
People from Asnières-sur-Seine
Footballers from Hauts-de-Seine
French people of Guadeloupean descent
Living people
French footballers
France youth international footballers
Association football midfielders
AS Monaco FC players
Cercle Brugge K.S.V. players
LB Châteauroux players
Manisa FK footballers
C.D. Mafra players
Championnat National 2 players
Challenger Pro League players
Belgian Pro League players
Ligue 2 players
TFF First League players
Liga Portugal 2 players
French expatriate footballers
Expatriate footballers in Belgium
French expatriate sportspeople in Belgium
Expatriate footballers in Monaco
French expatriate sportspeople in Monaco
Expatriate footballers in Turkey
French expatriate sportspeople in Turkey
Expatriate footballers in Portugal
French expatriate sportspeople in Portugal